Blacksocks is a European sock subscription service and online retailer. For an annual subscription price, customers receive three pairs of socks three times a year. The socks come in a limited variety of sizes and styles, with options such as calf socks, knee socks and silk cashmere socks. The socks are manufactured near Milan, Italy.

The company has also expanded into a line of underwear and t-shirts, as well as offering athletic and ski socks.

Blacksocks has 60,000 active customers, primarily in France, Germany and Switzerland, and, as of March 2009, the company maintains a growing presence in the United States.

History
The company was founded in 1999 by Marcel Roth and Samy Liechti as a general partnership. According to Liechti, he was inspired to form a sock subscription service after wearing and mismatched socks to a traditional Japanese tea ceremony for business clients. In 2001, the company changed its name to Blacksocks SA, a corporation based out of Zurich. Roth left the company in 2005. By 2009, Blacksocks had delivered over one million pairs of socks to Europe.

North American launch
Blacksocks expanded its coverage when it launched in North America on March 19, 2009. The company's subscription offers three pairs of identical socks every four months for an annual "sockscription" of $89. Lori Rosen, founder of New York-based public relations firm The Rosen Group, serves as managing partner for U.S. operations. The Rosen Group also oversees the company’s public relations efforts. Rosen was selected for the position after she approached Liechti about marketing the concept in North America after she learned of the service during a European business trip.

Milestone
In September 2008, Blacksocks celebrated its one millionth pair of calf socks sold.

Technology
In September 2012, Blacksocks released its Smarter Socks, the first socks to use radio-frequency identification technology to facilitate sorting and to ensure that each sock is correctly matched to its pair after washing. Smarter Socks are implanted with RFID chips that communicate with the Sock Sorter, which allows iPhones to be RFID-compliant.

In addition, Blacksocks released an iPhone mobile application, which, when used in conjunction with the Sock Sorter, beeps once a single sock is brought next to its pair. The app also contains a scanner that determines the extent of color fading for any brand of sock, and provides data about the socks such as wash count, date of order, paired status, sock ID number, and whether the sock is left- or right-footed.

In April 2017, Blacksocks launched an order button for customers to order socks and other items directly from their closets.

See also

List of sock manufacturers

References

External links

Socks
Hosiery brands
Online clothing retailers
Clothing retailers of Switzerland